Poa labillardierei, also known as common tussock-grass, is a species of tussock grass that is endemic to Australia.

The species was formally described in 1854 by German botanist and physician  Ernst Gottlieb von Steudel in Synopsis Plantarum Glumacearum.

References

labillardierei
Poales of Australia
Flora of the Australian Capital Territory
Flora of New South Wales
Flora of Queensland
Flora of South Australia
Flora of Tasmania
Flora of Victoria (Australia)